The Court of King's Bench of Manitoba—or the Court of Queen’s Bench of Manitoba, depending on the monarch—is the superior court of the Canadian province of Manitoba.

The court is divided into two divisions. The Family Division deals with family law cases including divorces, guardianships, adoptions and child welfare. The General Division deals with civil and criminal matters, including civil trials, probate law, indictable offences and applications for the review of decisions from certain administrative tribunals.

The current Chief Justice of the Court of King's Bench  is Judge Glenn Joyal, who was appointed on 3 February 2011.

History of the Court 

In May 1871, the legislature of Manitoba enacted The Supreme Court Act to establish a superior court with original and appellate jurisdiction in the province, called the Manitoba Supreme Court. The law provided:

There shall be constituted a Court of Justice for the Province of Manitoba, to be styled "The Supreme Court," which shall have jurisdiction over ail matters of Law and Equity, ail matters of wills and intestacy, and shall possess such powers and authorities in relation to matters of Local or Provincial jurisdiction, as in England are distributed among the Superior Courts of Law and Equity, and of Probate.

The Act also established inferior courts known as Petty Sessions. In 1872, The Supreme Court Act was amended by the Manitoba Legislature to change the name of the court to "The Court of Queen's Bench," and the first Chief Justice was appointed in July that year. Also that year, the Petty Sessions were abolished and County Courts were established.

In 1906, the appellate jurisdiction of the Court of Queen's Bench was transferred to the newly-established Manitoba Court of Appeal. In 1984, the County Courts were merged with the Court of Queen's Bench, and the judges of the County Courts became Court of Queen's Bench judges. Further, in 1984 the Family Division of the Court of Queen's Bench was established.

Divisions 
The court is divided into two divisions.

The Family Division deals with cases of family law and child protection, including divorces, guardianships, adoptions, and child welfare. Judges of the Family Division sit in Flin Flon, Morden, Selkirk, St. Boniface, The Pas, Thompson, and Winnipeg.

The General Division deals with civil and criminal matters, including civil trials, probate law, indictable offences and applications for the review of decisions from certain administrative tribunals. Judges of the General Division sit in Brandon, Dauphin, Flin Flon, Morden, Portage la Prairie, Selkirk, St. Boniface, Swan River, The Pas, Thompson, and Winnipeg.

Judges

Current justices

Past justices
Past justices of the Court of King's Bench of Manitoba have included:
 Gordon J. Barkman
 Alexander Morris
 James Charles McKeagney
 Louis Betourney
 Edmund Burke Wood
 Joseph Dubuc (Chief Justice of Manitoba from August 8, 1903 until 1909)
 James Andrews Miller
 Lewis Wallbridge
 Thomas Wardlaw Taylor
 Robert Smith
 Albert Clements Killam
 John Farquhar Bain
 Albert Elswood Richards
 William Edgerton Perdue
 Thomas Graham Mathers
 Daniel Alexander Macdonald
 John Donald Cameron
 Thomas Llewellyn Metcalfe
 James Emile Pierre Prendergast
 Hugh Amos Robson
 Alexander Casmir Galt
 John Philpot Curran
 Andrew Knox Dysart
 John Evans Adamson
 James Frederick Kilgour
 William James Donovan
 Percival John Montague
 Fawcett Gowler Taylor
 Ewan Alexander McPherson
 William James Major
 Esten Kenneth Williams
 Arnold Munroe Campbell
 Joseph Thomas Beaubien
 John Joseph Kelly
 Robert George Brian Dickson
 John Alton Duncan
 Richard J. Scott (currently serving as Chief Justice of the Manitoba Court of Appeal)
 Michel A. Monnin (currently serving as a judge on the Manitoba Court of Appeal)
 Freda M. Steel (currently serving as a judge on the Manitoba Court of Appeal)
 Barbara M. Hamilton
 Alan D. MacInnes (currently serving as a judge on the Manitoba Court of Appeal)
 Lori Douglas
 Robyn Diamond

See also
 Manitoba Justice
Manitoba Court of Appeal
Provincial Court of Manitoba
Judicial appointments in Canada

References

Further reading 
 Brawn, Dale. 2006. The Court of Queen's Bench of Manitoba 1870–1950:  A Biographical History. Toronto: Osgoode Society for Canadian Legal History.
 McCullough, Sharon Gail. 2000. Manitoba Court of Queen's Bench in Equity, 1872–1895: A Study in Legal Administration and Records. Winnipeg, University of Manitoba.
 Smandych, Russell, and Karina Sacca. 1996. "The Development of Criminal Law Courts in Pre-1870 Manitoba." Manitoba Law Journal 24:201.

External links 
 Court of King's Bench of Manitoba website
 Recent judgments
Publicly accessible court registry system
 Court of King's Bench of Manitoba decisions database
 History of Manitoba Judges

Manitoba courts
Manitoba
1872 establishments in Manitoba
Courts and tribunals established in 1872